Sensation is an indoor electronic dance music event which originated in Amsterdam, Netherlands, and organized by ID&T. The original event, which ran exclusively in the Amsterdam Arena for a period of five years until 2005, is now located throughout various European and a few non-European countries.

History
In 2000 and 2001 there were single events simply known as Sensation. Later Sensation was expanded into two annual events known as Sensation Black and Sensation White. This was done to differentiate the music and feeling more than would have been possible if it were one event. Sensation Black focuses more on 'darker' music, like Hardstyle and Hardcore, whereas Sensation White focuses more on trance music. Every year, Sensation also releases two doublediscs (Black and White) and two singles they call the Anthem. 2008 the names of both events have been changed: "Sensation" (formerly "Sensation White"), and "Black" (formerly "Sensation Black").

The first edition of Sensation, in 2000, did not sell out. The media announced that it was sold out in order to boost interest in the event, which eventually attracted 20,000 people. In this first edition, the DJs only used one side of the Amsterdam Arena as the stage. Later editions have the stage in the middle. This Sensation was the only one that did not have a dress code. All subsequent editions of Sensation White have sold out, usually well in advance (usually all 45,000 tickets are sold in a few hours). Sensation Black has not been as successful, but is usually either close to selling out, or sold out a few days before the event.

In 2005, Sensation White was also held in Belgium and Germany. In 2006, ID&T started Sensation International, an international tour, based on the simplified version which could be seen in the Amsterdam ArenA, in 2005. The first edition was held in the Antwerp Sportpaleis. In 2008 Sensation White was held at SCC Peterburgsky in Saint Petersburg, and a New Year version was held at the Telstra Dome in Melbourne on 31 December 2008 (38,380 attendance). Sensation White's new anthem put place in 2014 is "Tremor" by Martin Garrix, and Dimitri Vegas & Like Mike and Sensation White's official slogan is "Be part of the night, dress in white".

In 2017, it was announced that July's event was to be the last Sensation to take place in Amsterdam, with all future editions to be held outside of Holland.  Titled 'The Final', the last Amsterdam event took place on Saturday 8 July (breaking with the tradition of always taking place on the first Saturday of July) and attracted a sold-out capacity crowd of over 50,000 party people.  At the time of writing (July 2017) it's not clear how much longer the Sensation brand will continue outside of Holland, but there are parties booked toward the end of 2017 in Australia, Jakarta and Dubai.

Sensation (formerly known as Sensation White)

Sensation White used to be a trance event, but in later years it became a pure house event. All the attendees are required to wear white and the Amsterdam ArenA itself is decorated to match. Sensation White's slogan is "Be Part Of The Night – Dress in White". Every event has around 40,000–45,000 tickets available. The Amsterdam ArenA event takes place every year on the first Saturday in July while the German event in the LTU Arena in Düsseldorf is held on New Year's Eve. In 2009 it was organized for the first time on two subsequent nights on 3 and 4 July in the Amsterdam Arena where the opening of the Wicked Wonderland took place.

Notable DJs that have appeared at Sensation include Tiësto, Armin van Buuren, Swedish House Mafia, Hardwell, Marnix Bal, Martin Garrix, Nicky Romero, Afrojack, André Tanneberger, Darren Emerson (formerly of Underworld), David Guetta, NERVO, Dimitri Vegas & Like Mike, Erick E, Erick Morillo, Ferry Corsten, Marco V, Paul van Dyk, Sven Väth, Johan Gielen, Sander Kleinenberg, Steve Angello, Fedde Le Grand, Sebastian Ingrosso, Sander van Doorn, Mason, Felix Da Housecat, Chuckie, Laidback Luke, Tocadisco, Rank 1, DJ Jean, Judge Jules, Carl Cox, Martin Solveig, Dada Life, and Acraze.

The event has recently been criticized by trance fans who think there is too much house and electro and too few trance DJs in the recent events. However, in the eyes of the organizers, the popularity of trance has been receding in the past few years, and therefore Sensation White has adapted to this by altering its programming to add house and electro house. Nonetheless, the popularity of trance and indeed the DJs associated with the genre still seem to be a major force in Europe. Trance Energy, with over 30,000 people, has been selling out faster than ever before. In the 2008 edition of Sensation, there was only one trance DJ present in the line-up: Marco V. In 2009, trance was left out completely in favor of house (classics) and techno, however the music of the 2009 Amsterdam event turned out to be more trance like again.

In 2010, Sensation, to enforce the notion that they are now a House event, came up with the theme "Celebrate Life with House". It featured performances by Chuckie, Swedish House Mafia, Sunnery James and Ryan Marciano, and Joris Voorn & 2000 And One.  The event became exclusively a party for house music.  This change in genre caused that for the first time since 2000, the tickets did not sell out the same day they went on sale, as audiences are much more demanding.  In the end, about 35,000 people attended the festival held 3 July.  To create interest in the now House event, Sensation came up with a contest where the fans, via the social networks, would vote for their favorite theme and make it the anthem for 2010.  The competing songs, featuring a selection of house and minimal themes, were not well received by Sensation followers and the competition was eventually cancelled. During the main event in Amsterdam, Sensation decided to go back to its origins, by playing their trademark anthem "Superstring", reminding its fans that although it is now a House event, it stays true to its origins as promulgated by Ron Manager and the Three Musketeers.

BLACK (formerly known as Sensation Black)

BLACK slowly builds up the pace, starting from hard trance, hardstyle and then hardcore. Sensation Black is always held in the second weekend of July. All attendees are required to dress completely in black.

Notable DJs that have appeared at Sensation Black include Showtek, Angerfist, Headhunterz, Marcel Woods, Chris Liebing, DJ Lady Dana, DJ Luna, DJ Zany, The Prophet, Technoboy, Tommyknocker, Yoji Biomehanika and Mauro Picotto.

An incident occurred at Sensation Black in 2006, where DJ Rob Gee and his live band Ampt performed at the event against the recommendations of the majority of ID&T's staff, and were subsequently booed and catcalled during the performance, which was more rock/metal oriented. Slight mayhem ensued as a member of the audience climbed onto the stage and hit Rob Gee himself and was then repeatedly kicked and punched in the head by Rob and his band. The rest of Rob Gee's performance was cancelled and ID&T's manager, Duncan Stutterheim, later acknowledged his mistake in allowing Rob Gee to perform against the wishes of his employees.

The 2009 edition of BLACK was not held in the Netherlands, but only in Belgium because ID&T is looking for a better location.
Additionally Sensation (formerly known as "Sensation White") was held on two subsequent nights in the Amsterdam ArenA in 2009, but will be sharing one of the two available night licences for the Amsterdam ArenA in 2010 with the one time replacement of BLACK called the "Feestfabriek" from ID&T's sister organisation Q-dance.

The last and final edition of the festival was held in 2012. The QAPITAL event, which is annually held in the Ziggo Dome in Amsterdam since 2013 and is organised by Q-dance, is sometimes seen as its replacement.

Awards and nominations

International Dance Music Awards

See also
List of electronic music festivals

References

Sources

Official World-wide Site

Music festivals established in 2000
2000 establishments in the Netherlands
Electronic music festivals in the Netherlands
Trance festivals
Electronic music festivals in the United States
Electronic music festivals in the United Kingdom